Johan Rotsen (born 11 August 1996) is a French professional footballer who plays as a midfielder for Championnat National 2 club Sète.

Club career
On 2 August 2022, Rotsen signed with Sète.

Personal life 
Born in metropolitan France, Rotsen has origins in the Antilles; his father is a former footballer from Martinique, and his mother is from Guadeloupe. His younger brother Jessy is also a footballer.

References

External links 
 
 

1996 births
Living people
Footballers from Paris
French footballers
French people of Martiniquais descent
French people of Guadeloupean descent
Association football midfielders
AS Monaco FC players
USON Mondeville players
US Quevilly-Rouen Métropole players
FC Sète 34 players
Championnat National 2 players
Championnat National 3 players
Régional 1 players
Championnat National players
Ligue 2 players